Montalvo was an unincorporated village in Ventura County, California, founded in approximately 1887.  It was incorporated into the city of Ventura, California, in 2012. Montalvo is located in the southern portion of the city of Ventura, on the northern bank of the Santa Clara River. It is bounded by Victoria Avenue to the west, Ralston Street to the north, Johnson Drive to the east, and the Ventura Freeway to the south.

History
Montalvo was founded in approximately 1887 when the Southern Pacific Railroad reached the location. J. G. Hill, credited with being the "founder" of Montalvo, laid out plans for the town site in 1886.  Some accounts indicate that the community was named after Garci Rodríguez de Montalvo, the Spanish author who first described the Island of California in the 1510 novel Las Sergas de Esplandián.

In its early days, Montalvo was served by the Washington Street railroad depot. The depot was the terminus of the Southern Pacific Railroad in Ventura County. Goods destined for Ventura and Port Hueneme were unloaded at Montalvo and taken by cart to those locations.  The community also became a center for growing and processing apricots.  A school was built on Grand Avenue in 1889. In the 19th century, the community had a newspaper called the Montalvo Courier or the Evening Monitor. It was a thriving community in the late 19th century. In the late 1880s, the University of Southern California planned to establish a satellite campus, to be known as the "Collegiate Institute", on a grassy knoll in Montalvo. According to one account: "There was a splendid hotel beside the large depot. The town boasted a daily newspaper, a Chinese laundry, a general store and post office that was the center of life along the river." Montalvo promoters touted the community as "the Pasadena of Ventura County."

In the early 1900s, after railroad service was extended to Oxnard, most of the homes in Montalvo were physically relocated across the Santa Clara River to Oxnard. Oxnard became a boom town, and home mover John Brakey developed a thriving business loading homes on rollers and moving them across the dry river bed from Montalvo to Oxnard. During this time, Montalvo also lost its newspaper and printing press. By the 1920s, most of Montalvo's population had relocated elsewhere.

After World War II, several residential neighborhoods were built in Montalvo. In 1952, the community formed the Montalvo Sanitary District  (later renamed the Montalvo Municipal Improvement District) and built a sewage treatment plant to facilitate further development. Development was halted in 1958 when the Ventura County Health Department found the sewage treatment plant to be inadequate. After improvement to the sewage facilities, development resumed.

In 1961, Ventura County master plan consultants proposed developing Montalvo as "the core of an urban region" covering Ventura, Oxnard, Point Hueneme, and Saticoy, which was predicted to reach a population of 700,000 by 1980 and 2,000,000 by the year 2020. The consultants proposed making Montalvo the hub of Ventura County government, culture, and transportation, including development of a civic center and a state college. 

In 1967, the Ventura Freeway was constructed through Montalvo, resulting in significant financial losses to local merchants.

Annexation and crime problems
In the 1980s, residents debated proposals to accept annexation of Montalvo into the city of Ventura. An initial effort at annexation was defeated in 1992.

In the 1970s and 1980s, the city of Ventura moved eastward and 35 apartment buildings were constructed on three Montalvo streets south of the Bristol Shopping Center.  By 1990, Montalvo had a population of 4,630 and a median household income of $46,602. In the 1990s, the area began to experience increased blight and crime, including fights, drug dealing and tagging, as two gangs claimed the apartment area as their territory. In 1994, the Ventura Police Department opened a storefront substation in Montalvo to attempt to fight the increased crime.

Montalvo was finally annexed into the city of Ventura in September 2012.

Landmarks
Notable landmarks in Montalvo included Sam Korb's Trading Post, Loop's Restaurant, Little Heidelberg Restaurant, and The White Spot. 

Montalvo also was home to a mound in the northern part of the community that was thought to be the work of native Americans. It was described in the 1890s as having an altitude of 150 feet with smoothly sloping sides and approximately one-quarter mile in length. Later press reports indicate that large portions of the mound were removed to be used as fill dirt.

See also
 East Ventura station
 West Montalvo Oil Field

References

Ventura County, California
Ventura, California
Neighborhoods in Ventura County, California